Carl Degenkolb (1796-1862) was a German industrialist, who is generally understood to have pioneered the first codetermination plans in his factories, as well as participating in drafting the first codetermination law during the failed 1848 Revolutions.

See also
German labour law

Notes

References
Hans Jürgen Teuteberg, Geschichte der Industriellen Mitbestimmung (1961)

Labour law
1796 births
1862 deaths
Businesspeople from Stuttgart
Place of birth missing
People educated at the Karlsschule Stuttgart